The 2007–08 season was the 98th season in the history of Cádiz CF and the club's second consecutive in the second division of Spanish football. In addition to the domestic league, Cádiz participated in this season's edition of the Copa del Rey.

Players

First-team squad

Transfers

Competitions

Overall record

Segunda División

League table

Results summary

Results by round

Matches

Copa del Rey

Statistics

References

Cádiz CF seasons
Cádiz